The New Hampshire Wildcats represent the University of New Hampshire in Women's Hockey East Association play during the 2016–17 NCAA Division I women's ice hockey season.

Offseason
April 5: Alum Kacey Bellamy won a gold medal as an alternate captain with Team USA at the 2016 IIHF Ice Hockey Women's World Championship, held in Kamloops, British Columbia

Recruiting

Roster

2016–17 Wildcats

Schedule

|-
!colspan=12 style="background:#27408B;color:#FFFFFF;"| Regular Season

|-
!colspan=12 style="background:#27408B;color:#FFFFFF;"| WHEA Tournament

References

New Hampshire
New Hampshire Wildcats women's ice hockey seasons
New Ham
New Ham